Puraina is a village development committee in Banke District in Lumbini Province of south-western Nepal. Now, it is a part of Nepalgunj sub-metropolitan city.

References

Populated places in Banke District